M57 or M-57 may refer to:

Transport
 M-57 (Michigan highway), a state highway in Michigan
 M57 motorway, a motorway in England
 M57 (Cape Town), a Metropolitan Route in Cape Town, South Africa
 M57 (Johannesburg), a Metropolitan Route in Johannesburg, South Africa
 M57, a New York City Bus route in Manhattan

Weapons
 M57, variant of the MGM-140 ATACMS missile
 Halcón ML-57, an Argentine submachine gun
 TT pistol (Yugoslavian m57), a Yugoslavian-produced TT-33 pistol model, with an added safety
 Zastava M57, pistol

Other
 BMW M57, a 1998 diesel automobile engine
 Miles M.57 Aerovan, a 1945 British short-range, low-cost transport
 Messier 57 (M57), a planetary nebula also known as the Ring Nebula
 Rangeley Lake Seaplane Base (FAA LID: M57)